The military history of New Zealand is an aspect of the history of New Zealand that spans several hundred years. When first settled by Māori almost a millennium ago, there was much land and resources, but war began to break out as the country's carrying capacity was approached. Initially being fought with close range weapons of wood and stone, this continued on and off until Europeans arrived, bringing with them new weapons such as muskets. Colonisation by Britain led to the New Zealand Wars in the 19th century in which settler and imperial troops and their Māori allies fought against other Māori and a handful of Pākehā. In the first half of the 20th century, New Zealanders of all races fought alongside Britain in the Boer War and both World Wars. In the second half of the century and into this century the New Zealand Defence Force has provided token assistance to the United States in several conflicts. New Zealand has also contributed troops extensively to multilateral peacekeeping operations.

Māori tribal warfare before 1806

The level of intertribal warfare amongst pre-European Māori is unknown. Oral histories, legends and whakapapa include many stories of battles and wars but little research has been carried out into how often wars actually happened. In Making Peoples James Belich argues that they were probably uncommon in the few centuries immediately after the arrival of Māori in New Zealand in about 1280 CE, as there was ample land and resources to go around. Archaeological evidence suggests that following population growth and the extinction of the moa (a large flightless bird), warfare increased as tribes and hapū (subtribes) competed over scarce resources. At some point, perhaps before this cultural change, one group migrated to the Chatham Islands, where they developed the largely pacifist Moriori culture. Their pacifism left the Moriori unable to defend themselves when the islands were invaded by mainland Māori in the 1830s.

In the 'classic' Māori culture of 1550 CE onward, warriors were held in high esteem, and fought with a range of weapons including stone and wooden clubs (patu) fighting staffs (taiaha) and spears (tao). Māori were unusual in having no distance weapons such as bows or slings, so all fighting took place at close range. Defence was based on hill forts (pā), the remains of which can be seen all over New Zealand, especially the North Island. The largest battle recorded was that of Hingakaka with several thousand combatants.

Musket Wars (1806–1845)

The Musket Wars were a series of battles in the early 19th century, fought between various Māori tribal groups, mainly on the North Island. Northern tribes, such as the rival Ngā Puhi and Ngāti Whātua, were the first to obtain muskets and inflicted heavy casualties upon each other and on neighbouring tribes, some of whom had never seen firearms. In time, all the tribes traded to obtain muskets and the conflict ultimately reached an uneasy stalemate. The wars gave Māori experience in fighting with and defending against guns – experience which would be vital in the New Zealand Wars.

In the Harriet Affair of 1834, a group of British soldiers of the 50th Regiment from Australia landed in Taranaki to rescue the wife and children of John (Jacky) Guard and punish the kidnappers, the first clash between Māori and British troops. The expedition was sent by Governor Bourke from Sydney, but was subsequently criticised for use of excessive force by a British House of Commons report in 1835.

New Zealand Wars (1843–1872)

The New Zealand Wars were a series of wars fought between Māori on one side and a mixture of settler troops, imperial troops and Māori on the other. What the wars were fought over has been debated by historians, with Keith Sinclair arguing that they were about land, while James Belich has argued that although land was a major factor, the wars were essentially a contest over sovereignty. This debate is reflected in the naming of the wars: there is no real consensus over whether they should be called the 'New Zealand Wars' or the 'Land Wars', although Belich's books and television series about the conflict popularised the former term, as did a book by historian James Cowan published in the 1920s. The name 'Māori Wars' has fallen into disuse. Māori names for the armed conflicts are Te Riri Pākehā ("white man's anger") or Ngā pakanga o Aotearoa ("the great New Zealand wars"). While the fighting began in 1843 and the last shots were arguably fired in the early 20th century, the bulk of fighting took place in the 1860s.

The first skirmish of the New Zealand Wars was the 1843 Wairau Affray at the north end of the South Island. It was an isolated incident caused by the Nelson settlers trying to seize land they did not own, an extra-legal vigilante action that resulted in twenty-two of them being killed. The Flagstaff or Northern War took place in the far north of New Zealand, around the Bay of Islands, in March 1845 and January 1846. This was about mana—tribal prestige—and customs duties. It was really a war between rival Māori chiefs with the British fighting on one side for the prestige of the British Empire. This was followed almost immediately by the Hutt Valley Campaign, March to August 1846, and the Wanganui Campaign, April to July 1847, in the south-west of the North Island. Both these conflicts were about the encroachment of the European settlers onto Māori land. In the first three wars, Māori fought the British to a standstill each time. From the engagements emerged an understanding: English law prevailed in the townships and settlements, and Māori law and customs elsewhere. There followed a period of relative peace and economic cooperation from 1848 to 1860.

During this time European settlement accelerated and in about 1859 the number of Pākehā came to equal the number of Māori, at around 60,000 each. By now Pākehā had largely forgotten the painful lessons of the earlier conflicts. They tried to use military might to push through a very dubious land sale that the courts later repudiated. The result was the First Taranaki War. Once again the local British forces were more than evenly matched by Māori, and after twelve months both sides were happy to settle for a draw.

However, this was clearly just a preliminary. The British settlers were not prepared to countenance Māori controlling and ruling most of the land in the North Island. War broke out again in 1863 with the Invasion of the Waikato. To assist in this war, a temporary navy was established. This was the Waikato Flotilla, New Zealand's first de facto navy, comprising eight riverboats, four armoured barges, five coastal boats and a naval dockyard. The Waikato War, including the Tauranga Campaign, was the biggest of all the New Zealand Wars. The outcome of this war was the major confiscation of land owned by Māori, which quickly provoked the Second Taranaki War. By the mid-1860s the conflict had forced the closing of all the native schools.

The period from the second half of 1864 until early 1868 was relatively quiet. Possibly the most notorious incident during this time was the murder of the missionary Carl Volkner. There were also two serious intra-tribal conflicts, civil wars in Māori tribes, between adherents and non-adherents of the Pai Marire or Hau Hau sect—a vehemently anti-Pākehā religious group which was intent upon balancing the developing unbalanced cooperation between the Māori and Pākehā. These are sometimes known as the East Cape War, but that label oversimplifies a complicated series of conflicts. The last major conflicts were Te Kooti's War and Titokowaru's War. These were fought at the same time but were not related to each other and should be considered as separate conflicts. This ended the major, violent conflicts between the new colonial government and the original occupants of the land.

There were subsequently other conflicts and incidents that were a part of the overall conflict, but are not usually seen in the context of the New Zealand Wars. The invasion of Parihaka in 1881 was certainly one of these. There was an incident in the 1890s that became known as the Dog Tax War. Another was the arrest of Rua Kenana in 1916. It is even possible that events at Bastion Point in the 1970s should be considered as part of the same scenario.

Second Boer War (1899–1902)

The Second Boer War, fought from 11 October 1899 until 31 May 1902 and between the British Empire and the two independent Boer republics of the Orange Free State and the South African Republic (Transvaal Republic), resulted from the history of British encroachment into or involvement in areas already settled by Afrikaners – who were known colloquially as Boers (farmers) – the descendants of the original Dutch settlers. This was exacerbated by the discovery of gold and diamonds in the South African Republic, after which many miners from British Empire countries migrated there.

New Zealand decided to help fight for the Empire and sent 6,500 mounted troops to assist the British efforts, making the war New Zealand's first overseas military campaign. Virtually every man in New Zealand was desperately keen to get to war, so the first soldiers to go were selected on the basis of who could afford to go. If a man could provide his own horse, rifle and equipment, costing about £25 in total, he could go to war. The first two of the 10 contingents paid their own way. The proposal to send the first contingent – 200 mounted riflemen – was approved by Parliament prior to the outbreak of war on 28 September 1899. Prime Minister Richard Seddon's proposition to do so was overwhelmingly supported, meeting opposition from only five members of parliament.

The volunteers of the first two contingents were mainly members of New Zealand's existing permanent or voluntary forces and were expected to supply their own equipment and horses. The Third and Fourth Contingents were organised by regional politicians and businesspeople: the Third organised mainly from Canterbury, and the Fourth from Otago. These two Contingents were also largely paid for through local fundraising rather than central government, and together they became known as the Rough Riders. The remaining contingents were funded by the British Government. The Boer War was the first overseas conflict to involve New Zealand troops, and was the first conflict the nation was involved in since the New Zealand Wars had ceased in the early 1870s. The New Zealand soldiers in South Africa suffered 230 casualties – most of those from either accident or disease.

The women of New Zealand were also supportive of the war. Girls' and Ladies' Khaki Corps (or 'Contingents') were organised throughout the country during 1900 to raise funds as part of New Zealand's South African War effort (1899–1902). Denied entry into active war service, women threw themselves into patriotic work on the home front. The contingents were quickly established throughout New Zealand in cities and small towns. Young society women dressed in khaki uniforms with skirts and hats (modelled on men's uniforms). The Khaki Corps had a full range of military titles and local volunteer officers coached members in military exercises. Members participated in influential fundraising events such as the Patriotic Carnival at Government House in 1900 organised by Lady Douglas in aid of the Wellington More Men Fund.

In total, New Zealand provided ten contingents to the British, numbering 6,500 men. New Zealand losses were seventy-one men killed in action, twenty-five killed in accidents and 133 of disease. Figures for New Zealanders serving with units outside of the New Zealand contingents are unknown.

First World War (1914–1918)

When the United Kingdom declared war on Germany at the start of the First World War, the dominion of New Zealand automatically entered the war also.

The total number of New Zealand troops and nurses to serve overseas in 1914–1918, excluding those in British and other Dominion forces, was 103,000, from a population of just over a million. Forty-two percent of men of military age served in the NZEF. 16,697 New Zealanders were killed and 41,317 were wounded during the war – a 58 percent casualty rate. Approximately a further thousand men died within five years of the war's end, as a result of injuries sustained, and 507 died whilst training in New Zealand between 1914 and 1918. The First World War saw Māori soldiers officially serve for the first time in a major conflict with the New Zealand Army. 2688 Māori and 346 Pacific islanders served with New Zealand forces in total.

New Zealand's first act of the war was to seize and occupy German Samoa. Although Germany refused to officially surrender the islands, no resistance was offered and the occupation took place without any fighting – the second German territory to be occupied in the name of King George V. After Major General Alexander Godley departed with the New Zealand Expeditionary Force in October 1914, Major General Alfred William Robin commanded New Zealand Military Forces at home throughout the War as commandant, and was pivotal in ensuring the ongoing provision of reinforcements and support to the New Zealand military forces within New Zealand.

The first major battle fought by New Zealand troops was Gallipoli. A navigational error led to the ANZACs (Australian and New Zealand Army Corps) being landed at the wrong place. 2701 New Zealanders were killed and 4852 wounded during a bitter struggle which failed to achieve any military objectives. Despite this, the significance of the battle of Gallipoli was strongly felt in New Zealand (and Australia) where it was the first great conflict experienced by the fledgling nations. The landing is commemorated in New Zealand and Australia each year, on Anzac Day.

New Zealanders fought elsewhere in the Middle East, where they took a minor part in the Senussi Campaign and, more importantly, in the ultimately successful Sinai and Palestine Campaign against the Turkish. New Zealanders fought in most of the battles leading up to the fall of Jerusalem and the defeat of the Ottoman Army, and were praised for their fighting alongside their Australian and British comrades. A total of 17,723 New Zealanders served in this campaign and New Zealand casualties were 640 killed in action and 1,146 wounded.

In France, the New Zealand Division participated in the Battle of the Somme, where they advanced three kilometres and captured eight kilometres of enemy front line. 7,048 had become casualties, of whom 1,560 were killed. In June 1917, the New Zealand Division further distinguished itself in the storming of Messines ridge and the capture of the village of Messines. This was the first time the division had failed in a major operation and remains the worst disaster in New Zealand's history in terms of lives lost in a single day. 

The division also fought against the German spring offensive of 1918. Later they captured the town of Le Quesnoy in a daring assault led by Lieutenant Leslie Cecil Lloyd Averill on 4 November 1918. The day proved to be Division's most successful of their whole time on the Western Front as they pushed east and advanced ten kilometres, capturing 2000 German soldiers and sixty field guns.

New Zealand also contributed to the war at sea. The cruiser HMS Philomel patrolled the Gulf of Alexandretta in the Eastern Mediterranean, supporting several landings and sustaining three fatal casualties, one being the first New Zealander killed in action in the war. She also took part in the defence of the Suez Canal, operations in the Gulf of Aden and patrols in the Persian Gulf. In June 1917, a German raider laid minefields in New Zealand waters, causing the loss of a merchant ship off Farewell Spit and another off Three Kings Islands.

New Zealand had no air force of her own during the First World War but several hundred New Zealanders served with the Royal Flying Corps, the Royal Naval Air Service, the Royal Air Force and Australian Flying Corps.

Fiji Expeditionary Force (1920) 
In the first peacetime deployment of New Zealand Forces overseas (other than commemorative contingents), New Zealand deployed a fifty six strong force of regular soldiers to Fiji to support the civilian authorities during a period of civil unrest. Under the command of Major Edward Puttick, the small force deployed to Fiji on the government steamer Tutanekai on 5 February 1920 and would remain in Fiji until 18 April 1920.

Second World War (1939–1945)

New Zealand entered World War II by declaring war on Germany as of 9.30 pm, on 3 September 1939 (NZT). Politically, New Zealand had been a vocal opponent of European fascism and also the appeasement of those dictatorships, national sentiment for a strong show of force was generally supported. Economic and defensive considerations also motivated the New Zealand involvement; reliance on Britain meant that if she were threatened, New Zealand would be too in terms of economic and defensive ties. There was also a strong sentimental link between the former British colony and the United Kingdom, with many seeing Britain as the "mother country" or "Home". The Prime Minister of the time, Michael J. Savage, summed this up at the outbreak of war with a quote that would become a popular cry in New Zealand during the war;:"Where Britain goes, we go! Where she stands, we stand!"

New Zealand provided personnel for service in the British Royal Air Force (RAF) and British Royal Navy, the New Zealand Division of the Royal Navy was placed at the Admiralty's disposal, and new medium bombers waiting in the United Kingdom to be shipped to New Zealand were made available to the RAF. The New Zealand Army contributed the 2nd New Zealand Expeditionary Force (2NZEF). In total, around 140,000 New Zealand personnel served overseas for the Allied war effort, and an additional 100,000 men were armed for Home Guard duty. At its peak in July 1942, New Zealand had 154,549 men and women under arms (excluding the Home Guard) and by the war's end a total of 194,000 men and 10,000 women had served in the armed forces at home and overseas. The costs for the country were high – 11,625 killed, a ratio of 6,684 dead per million in the population which was the highest rate in the Commonwealth (Britain suffered 5,123 and Australia 3,232 per million population).

Middle East and Europe
The 2nd New Zealand Expeditionary Force (2NZEF) was formed under Major-General Bernard C. Freyberg and would see active service in the Mediterranean and Middle East throughout the war, fighting in Greece, Crete, North Africa, Italy, and Yugoslavia. The main fighting unit of the expeditionary force was the 2nd New Zealand Division, also commanded by Freyberg.

The 2NZEF participated in the Battle of Greece, in April 1941, along with British and other Commonwealth troops, and Greek defenders. After Germany invaded Greece the Allies were forced to retreat, and the New Zealanders lost 291 men killed, 1,826 captured and 387 seriously wounded. Most of the remaining New Zealand troops were evacuated to Crete, where Freyberg became commander of the Allied forces on the island. The Germans subsequently invaded Crete, and after several days of heavy fighting in the Battle of Crete, took the island. Ultimately 17,000 troops were evacuated to Alexandria by the British surrender on 1 June. Most of the New Zealanders made it, but 2,180 were captured. Additional New Zealand casualties for the Battle of Crete were 671 dead and 967 wounded. New Zealand Second Lieutenant Charles Upham, the only person to receive two Victoria Crosses during World War II and the only combat soldier to receive the award twice, gained his first award during the battle.

From November 1941, the 2NZEF was heavily involved in the North African Campaign. As part of Operation Crusader, New Zealand troops took part in the relief of Tobruk after the city had been besieged by the German Afrika Korps, under Erwin Rommel. Subsequently, the New Zealand government insisted that the division be withdrawn to Syria to recover – 879 men were killed and 1,700 wounded in Operation Crusader, the most costly battle the division fought in the Second World War. In June 1942, the Afrika Korps captured Tobruk, and the 2NZEF was recalled from Syria. The Korps' advance was halted by the Allies in the First Battle of El Alamein, where New Zealand troops captured Ruweisat Ridge in a successful night attack. Heavy casualties were suffered by the two New Zealand brigades involved as they were attacked by German tanks, with several thousand men taken prisoner. Charles Upham earned a bar for his Victoria Cross in this battle. Subsequent fighting, including the Second Battle of El Alamein, resulted in German retreat from the area, into Tunisia. On 13 May 1943, the North African campaign ended, with the surrender of the last 275,000 Axis troops in Tunisia. On the 15th the division began the withdrawal back to Egypt, and by 1 June the division was back in Maadi and Helwan, on standby for use in Europe. Total New Zealand losses since November 1941, were 2,989 killed, 7,000 wounded and 4,041 taken prisoner.

New Zealand troops were transferred to the Italian Front later in the year and participated in the Battle of Monte Cassino and the advance through northern Italy through to the German surrender and the 2nd Division's occupation of Trieste. from Germany.

Pacific
When Japan entered the war in December 1941, the New Zealand government raised another expeditionary force known as the 2nd NZEF in the Pacific, or 2nd NZEF (I.P.), for service with the Allied Pacific Ocean Areas command. This force supplemented existing garrison troops in the South Pacific. The main fighting formation of the 2nd NZEF (I.P.) was the 3rd New Zealand Division. However the 3rd Division never fought as a formation; its component brigades being involved in semi-independent actions as part of the Allied forces in the Solomons, in Vella Lavella, Treasury Islands and Green Islands.

The New Zealand Army units were eventually replaced by American formations, which released personnel for service with the 2nd Division in Italy, or to cover civilian labour shortages. Air force squadrons and Navy units contributed to the Allied island hopping campaign.

German and Japanese surface raiders and submarines operated in New Zealand waters on several occasions in 1940, 1941, 1942, 1943 and 1945 sinking a total of four ships.

Naval war
At the outbreak of war, New Zealand still contributed to the New Zealand Division of the Royal Navy. Many New Zealanders served alongside other Commonwealth sailors in vessels of the Royal Navy and would continue to do so throughout the war.

Not until 1941 was the Royal New Zealand Navy formed. Before then New Zealand men and ships had already been in action. On 13 December 1939  took part in The Battle of the River Plate as part of small British force against the German pocket battleship Admiral Graf Spee. The action resulted in the German ship retiring to neutral Uruguay and being scuttled a few days later. Other cruisers  and HMNZS Leander took the RNZN to all theatres – Leander destroyed Italian "auxiliary cruiser" Ramb I and helped destroy the Japanese cruiser Jintsu.  Gambia was present at the Japanese surrender. A morale boosting episode was the encounter between two small and out gunned minesweepers – HMNZS Kiwi and Moa – and the much larger Japanese submarine I-1, which was destroyed by ramming.

Air war

The role of the Royal New Zealand Air Force was initially seen as a purely training organisation which supplied pilots to the Royal Air Force. New Zealand's only modern aircraft – 30 Vickers Wellington bombers – had been loaned to the United Kingdom, along with their aircrew, in August 1938.

Over ten thousand New Zealanders served as aircrew with the Royal Air Force, 3,290 of them lost their lives, and 580 were made prisoners of war. Three won Victoria crosses. While the majority served with squadrons composed of airmen from all parts of the Commonwealth, 7 squadrons of the Royal Air Force were designated New Zealand units, one of these, No. 75 Squadron RNZAF flew the most missions and suffered the highest casualties of any allied bomber squadron. Several New Zealanders rose to high rank in the Royal Air Force, of whom Air Vice Marshal Sir Keith Park, who commanded No 11 Group, Fighter Command which bore the brunt of the Battle of Britain, is probably the best known.

When Japan entered the war the RNZAF was immediately in the front line. The undertrained and equipped No. 488 Squadron RNZAF fought a futile defence of Singapore, while obsolete giant biplane Short Singapores and Vickers Vincents were operating from Fiji. The RNZAF had already undertaken some fruitless searches for German commerce raiders. However, in December 1941, it was still essentially a training organisation for the RAF. Over the next 12 months the RNZAF undertook rapid transition into a combat force – initially arming all available machines, including airliners, against possible Japanese attack, then, re-equipping with more modern lendlease machines, before moving forward to take the war to Japan. Including training establishments, more New Zealanders ended up serving with the RNZAF than RAF, (although fewer aircrew). Ultimately the RNZAF sent 13 squadrons of fighter aircraft, 6 bomber squadrons, two torpedo bomber squadrons, two flying boat squadrons and three transport squadrons against the Japanese, and this force achieved considerable success in 1943–1944. The highest scoring commonwealth ace in the Pacific was a New Zealander, Geoff Fisken.

Aftermath
Troops of the 2NZEF and RNZAF 14 Squadron contributed to the Commonwealth Occupation Force in Japan after the end of the war, remaining there until 1948. The RNZAF was also involved in the airlift of supplies to West Berlin during the Berlin Blockade by the Soviet Union in the late 1940s. This was New Zealand's first involvement in what was to become the Cold War.

Compulsory Military Training (1949–1959, 1962–1972)
 
From the late 1940s to the early 1970s, compulsory military training (CMT) was twice established by a National Party government and then abolished by a Labour Party government. On 3 August 1949 a national referendum was held in regards to instituting CMT, and conscription into the Territorial Force of the New Zealand Army. The vote was 553,016 in favour of conscription and 152,443 against. More than 60,000 young New Zealanders completed the 18 weeks of training. The second Labour government abolished the programme in 1958, but it was reinstated in revised form after Labour lost power. About 3,000 18-year-olds were selected annually by a ballot of birthdates.

The scheme was abolished by the third Labour government on 31 December 1972. Since that date, all service in the New Zealand Armed Forces has been voluntary. Conscripts were never sent to battle zones in this period, although many opted to continue their military careers and fight in Malaysia, Vietnam and other theatres of conflict.

Malaysia (1949–1966)

Malayan Emergency (1949–1964)
The Malayan Emergency was declared by the British government on 18 June 1948 after several rubber plantation workers were killed in a revenge attack over the deaths of labour activists killed in police charges. This led to the creation of the Malayan National Liberation Army (MNLA), a communist guerrilla organisation which fought for an independent Malaya free from colonialism, and for equal rights for women and all races. New Zealand's first contribution came in 1949, when C-47 Dakotas of RNZAF No. 41 Squadron were attached to the Royal Air Force's Far East Air Force.

New Zealand became more directly involved in the Emergency from 1955, following its decision to contribute forces to the British Commonwealth Far East Strategic Reserve, the primary role of which was to deter communist aggression in South-East Asia, and to provide a capacity for the immediate implementation of defence plans in the event that deterrence failed. As a secondary role, the forces committed to the Reserve were permitted to take part in actions against the guerrillas. The Special Air Service (SAS) and the RNZAF were deployed, with the RNZAF carrying out its first operational strike mission since the Second World War and its first with jet aircraft. In 1958 the New Zealand Regiment replaced the SAS. By the time the 2nd Battalion of the New Zealand Regiment arrived in late 1959 as part of 28th British Commonwealth Brigade, to replace the 1st Battalion, most of the Communist guerrillas had retreated across the border into southern Thailand and the Malayan government saw the security situation to be stable enough to declare the Emergency over on 31 July 1960. New Zealand soldiers would be periodically deployed to Border Security Area as part of counter-insurgency measures over the next four years. About 1300 New Zealanders served in the Emergency, of whom 15 died, three as a result of enemy action.

Indonesia-Malaysia Confrontation (1963–66)

As a part of its withdrawal from its Southeast Asian colonies, the United Kingdom moved to combine its colonies on Borneo, Sarawak and British North Borneo, with those on peninsular Malaya, to form the Federation of Malaysia. This move was opposed by the government of Indonesia. The Indonesia-Malaysia confrontation began on 20 January 1963 when Indonesian Foreign Minister Subandrio announced that Indonesia would pursue a policy of Konfrontasi (Confrontation) with the Malaysia.

From late 1963 the British requested New Zealand military aid in the area. The second National government initially refused, not wishing to be involved in a war with Indonesia. However, when Indonesian paratroopers landed in Johore in September 1964, the New Zealand Infantry Regiment was one of the few Commonwealth units in the region and with the New Zealand government's permission hunted down the infiltrators. The following month, 52 soldiers landed in Pontian on the Johore-Malacca border and were also captured by New Zealand soldiers.

A change in New Zealand policy came as Sukarno increased the flow of Indonesian insurgents into Borneo and British military resources were stretched to almost breaking point. The New Zealand government could no longer deny the genuine appeals for assistance and the first New Zealand deployment was made to fight the insurgency – a Special Air Service detachment and the 1st Battalion of the Royal New Zealand Infantry Regiment, along with several Navy ships. New Zealand forces were involved in some fighting, but in late 1965 General Suharto came to power in Indonesia, following a coup d'état. Due to this domestic conflict, Indonesian interest in pursuing the war with Malaysia declined, and the conflict officially ended in May 1966.

Korean War (1950–1953)

New Zealand contributed seven frigates, several smaller craft and a 1044 strong volunteer force (known as KAYFORCE) to the Korean War. The ships were under the command of a British flag officer and formed part of the US Navy screening force during the Battle of Inchon, and performed shore raids and inland bombardments. KAYFORCE was formed around an artillery regiment, 16th Field Regiment, and distinguished itself at the Battle of Kapyong.  New Zealand troops remained in Korea in significant numbers for four years after the 1953 armistice, the last New Zealand soldiers leaving in 1957, and a single liaison officer remained until 1971. A total of 3,794 New Zealand soldiers served in KAYFORCE and 1300 in the Navy deployment. 33 were killed in action, 79 wounded and 1 soldier was taken prisoner. That prisoner was held in North Korea for eighteen months and repatriated after the armistices. A New Zealander flying with the Royal Air Force was also captured when he was shot down near P'yongyang, and was repatriated at around the same time. One RNZN sailor was killed during the conflict.

Vietnam War (1964–1972)

As for other countries, the Vietnam War would prove to be a highly controversial conflict for New Zealand, sparking widespread protest at home from anti-Vietnam War movements modelled on their American counterparts. This conflict was also the first in which New Zealand did not fight alongside the United Kingdom, instead following the loyalties of the ANZUS Pact. New Zealand's contribution commenced in 1964 with an initial deployment of non-combatant engineers followed by an artillery battery (161 Battery RNZA) from 1965; 2 infantry companies (V and W Companies) drawn from the 1st Battalion, Royal New Zealand Infantry Regiment in Malaysia from 1967; and the New Zealand SAS from 1968. New Zealand combat forces served alongside Australian forces until 1971. Two NZDF training teams followed, contributing to the allied effort to teach South Vietnamese forces to defend themselves before leaving in 1972. Over 5 years the RNZIR companies did 9 tours between them, and along with the NZSAS saw consistent action with few losses (37 KIA and 187 wounded), a testament to their skills in jungle warfare. Almost 4000 New Zealanders served in Vietnam.

Afghanistan (2001–2021)

New Zealand forces fought in Afghanistan following the United States-led invasion of that country after the 11 September 2001 attacks. SAS personnel were dispatched in late 2001, and in March 2002 they took part in Operation Anaconda against about 500 to 1000 al-Qaeda and Taliban forces in the Shahi-Kot Valley and Arma Mountains southeast of Zurmat. New Zealand also supplied two transport aircraft and the 122-strong tri-service New Zealand Provincial Reconstruction Team (NZPRT), which was located in Bamyan Province from April 2003. A further deployment in 2004 resulted in members of an SAS contingent receiving gallantry decorations that were gazetted in 2007, including a Victoria Cross for Corporal Willie Apiata.

Lieutenant Tim O'Donnell 2/1 RNZIR, part of the NZPRT, was killed and two other New Zealanders wounded in combat on 4 August 2010. It was the first combat death of a New Zealand soldier since Leonard Manning was killed in East Timor in July 2000. Douglas Grant of the SAS was killed on 18 August 2011 while responding to an attack on the British Council building in Kabul. Leon Smith of the SAS was killed on 28 September 2011 during an operation in Wardak Province. Three more soldiers were killed by an IED in August 2012. The NZPRT withdrew from Bamyan in April 2013, with a small New Zealand contingent remaining in Kabul. This contingent contributed personnel to the Afghan National Army Officer Academy and, in June 2019, the New Zealand Government decided to continue the involvement of New Zealand troops until June 2020.

As of April 2013, New Zealand's contribution to the war in Afghanistan had cost $300 million. By September 2018, NZDF troops had suffered eight combat deaths.

In February 2021, the New Zealand Defence Force confirmed that it would end its 20-year deployment in May 2021 with the withdrawal of six personnel from the Afghan National Army's Officer Academy and NATO's Resolute Support Mission Headquarters.

Withdrawal and fall of the Islamic Republic of Afghanistan 
Following the Fall of Kabul in 2021, the ruling government led by Jacinda Ardern faced broad criticism from National and ACT parties for seemingly abandoning Afghan people who had assisted New Zealand, including drivers, labourers, cleaners, cooks and translators. Particular importance was placed on Immigration Minister Kris Faafoi's rejection of these applications.

ACT party leader David Seymour stated:

"If these people have been abandoned to grotesque death after helping New Zealand due to procrastination at ministerial level I don't think anyone in good consience could carry on as the minister. If there were good reasons not to help them I think the government should be upfront about that too. These people were tractor drivers, labourers, cleaners and cooks for our Defence Force. Today they are fearing for their lives because of the assistance they gave New Zealand. Ardern told media this morning 'we have to make decisions quickly,' – quickly would have been months ago... Canada got the Afghan people who helped them out last month."

National's Foreign Affairs spokesperson Gerry Brownlee told Radio New Zealand that the government should make efforts to bring at-risk groups to New Zealand.

"It's very easy to be, in hindsight, saying that some particular action should have taken place. I think the issue now is the immediate problem that we face and some steps need to be taken to put us into as good a position as possible to be out of it and to ensure that people whose lives are under threat are removed as quickly as possible."

Green Party MP Golriz Ghahraman additionally commented that New Zealand should expand its evacuation efforts.

Evacuation efforts 
In early August 2021, following early rapid gains by the Taliban, the New Zealand government stated that it would be considering revisiting a 2012 policy initiated by the previous National-Led Government, which oversaw 140 Afghans – interpreters employed by the Defence Force and their family members – relocated to New Zealand. However, due to the rapid territorial gains and capture of Kabul by Taliban forces, no further action was taken in this regard.

Prime Minister Jacinda Ardern announced on the 16th of August 2021 plans to send a single RNZAF C-130H Hercules aircraft with a contingent of troops to Hamid Karzai International Airport in Kabul in order to aid in the evacuation of New Zealand citizens and Afghans who have assisted New Zealand forces. This decision was met with criticism from opposition political parties, as well as defense analysts such as Simon Ewing-Jarvie.

National Party leader Judith Collins criticised the Prime Minister in stating that the government could have acted much quicker.

"Canada announced last month it would resettle Afghans who worked with them, and the first group had already touched down on Monday. While our Five Eyes partners mobilised over the weekend, the Labour Government all but said, 'we will get to it on Monday.' The Taliban wasn't willing to wait for business hours,"

Operations against ISIS 
On 8 August 2014, US-led coalition military operations against ISIS commenced in Iraq following an urgent request for international assistance from the Iraqi Government. This operation was formalised in September 2014 under the US designator Operation Inherent Resolve. New Zealand noted that the reason they joined the operation was due to ISIS's unprecedented success, brutal tactics and harm to civilians, and ability to recruit, fund and carry out sophisticated combat, terrorist and information operations.

Peacekeeping and observer missions
The New Zealand military has been involved in a number of peacekeeping and observer missions. These have included military observation in Bosnia and Herzegovina from 1992 to 2004, humanitarian action in Somalia from 1992 to 1994, military observation in Haiti from 1994 to 1995, and military liaison in Kosovo from 1999 to the present. Operations in which a significant number of New Zealanders participated include:

Kashmir (1952–76)

In 1952, three New Zealand officers were seconded as military observers for the United Nations Military Observer Group in the Kashmir, to supervise a ceasefire between Pakistan and India. Many New Zealand officers, including Territorial Force officers, saw service with the force until 1976.

Lebanon/Syria/Israel: UNTSO
For many years, New Zealand has contributed Military Observers (currently eight NZDF personnel) to the United Nations Truce Supervision Organization (UNTSO) in the Middle East. These personnel work as military observers and are based in Syria, Israel and Southern Lebanon. The observers ensure that peace agreements or cease fires are observed and any violations to peace or security in the region are reported. In the aftermath of Israeli operations against Hezbollah in 2006, a joint Explosive Ordnance Disposal team was deployed to assist in clearing a large quantity of unexploded munitions in Southern Lebanon.

Rhodesia: Operation Agila (1979–1980)

In 1979, New Zealand contributed a force of seventy-five officers and men to the Commonwealth Monitoring Force which was established to oversee the implementation of the agreement which had ended the Rhodesian War. Troops supervised the concentration of the guerrilla forces into sixteen Assembly Places during the period in which the cease fire was implemented and national elections held. Following the election the Commonwealth Monitoring Force began withdrawing from the newly independent and renamed Zimbabwe on 2 March 1980 with the final members of the force leaving on 16 March.

Multi-National Force and Observers (1982–present)
On ANZAC Day 1982, a small group of twenty six New Zealand soldiers arrived in the Sinai as New Zealand's commitment to the Multinational Force and Observers (MFO). This was to be the beginning of an ongoing commitment of New Zealand Peacekeepers to the Sinai region. The task of the MFO was initially to supervise the withdrawal of Israeli military units from Egyptian territory. A rotary wing of the Royal New Zealand Air Force also served until 1986. New Zealand increased its commitment to this Mission, which is now tri-service in nature, with a group of about two platoons of specialist servicemen and women serving a six-month Tour of Duty with the MFO.

Iran-Iraq War (1988)
During the Iran–Iraq War two New Zealand frigates joined the Royal Navy in monitoring merchant shipping in the Persian Gulf. A team of 10 deployed to the Persian Gulf in August 1988 as part of the United Nations Iran–Iraq Military Observer Group to monitor compliance with the ceasefire.

Iraq (1990–1998)
In September 1990, the tanker HMNZS Endeavour was deployed alongside the Royal Australian Navy (RAN) task force to assist with transportation. On the 17 December 1990, New Zealand two C-130 Hercules transport aircraft of No.40 Squadron arrived at King Khalid airport. These aircraft delivered troops and freight such as ammunition, mail, and equipment. They conducted 157 sorties and were withdrawn on the 4 April 1991.  On the 16 January 1991, 32 of the 1st New Zealand Army Medical Team were integrated with the 6th Naval Fleet in Bahrain. They were later joined on the 21 January with a 20 strong tri-service medical team. From February 1991, Six Skyhawks and 60 personnel of No.2 Squadron assisted RAN anti-aircraft exercises. 119 NZ personnel were deployed in the Persian Gulf war consisting of maintenance and admin staff, pilots, air-movements, guards, and medics.

After the war, New Zealand contributed UNSCOM staff to verify Iraqi weapon facilities. In October 1995 and May 1996, HMNZS Wellington and Canterbury were deployed to the Persian Gulf to enforce sanctions. In 1998, during operation Desert Thunder, two Orion aircraft and two NZSAS teams in addition to a naval team were deployed to Diego Garcia and Kuwait respectively.

Cambodia (1991–2005) 
In 1992, New Zealand contributed 30 non-combatant engineers to the Mine Clearing Training Unit (MCTU) and 40 communications specialists. In late 1992, the RNZN tasked a 30 strong team with coastal patrols and aided Vietnamese refugees.

Somalia (1992–1995) 

New Zealand contributed to the International and United Nations Operation in Somalia efforts in Somalia with:

New Zealand Army
Supply Detachment, Dec 1992 to June 1993
Supply Platoon x 2 rotations, July 1993 to July 1994
Senior officers and admin pers with UNOSOM headquarters, 1992 to 1995
Royal New Zealand Air Force 
42 Squadron (Andover C Mk1) x 2 rotations, 1992–1993

Somalia was the first deployment of New Zealand combat troops to a war zone since the Vietnam War, 1 RNZIR contributed a rifle section to provide security for the New Zealand Supply Contingent in Somalia from July 1993.

Former Yugoslavia (1992–2007)
New Zealand's commitment to the Balkan states commenced in 1992 with the deployment of five soldiers as UN Military Observers serving with the United Nations Protection Force (UNPROFOR). In March 1994 to January 1996 New Zealand committed the first of Five Company Groups of mechanised infantry serving as part of British battalions. These were termed OP RADIAN. When this commitment was withdrawn New Zealand continued to commit 12 to 15 artillery and armoured soldiers to the British contingent, as well as three Staff Officers to the NATO Stabilisation Force (SFOR). As the mission evolved, the New Zealand contingent changed to a Liaison and Observation Team in the Bosnian town of Preijedor. The contribution was maintained through the handover of the NATO SFOR mission to the European Union EUFOR Althea on 2 December 2004. The LOT was withdrawn on 5 April 2007 but the three staff officers, the last in a continuous 15-year contribution to the peacekeeping effort in the former Yugoslavia, departed on 29 June 2007. One member was seriously wounded during this period.

East Timor (1999–2003, 2006)

Following East Timor's vote for independence in 1999, the Australian-led INTERFET (International Force East Timor) was deployed with the permission of the Indonesian Government in response to a complete breakdown in order. INTERFET was composed of contributions from 17 nations, about 9,900 in total. New Zealand's contribution in East Timor included SAS special forces, infantry battalion and helicopters, backed by RNZN warships and RNZAF transport.
  
INTERFET was replaced by a United Nations mission (UNTAET – United Nations Transitional Authority in East Timor) which sought to move East Timor toward elections and self-government and the troops came under the command of UNTAET in late 2000, which was in turn replaced by UNMISET in 2002. At its peak, the New Zealand Defence Force had 1,100 personnel in East Timor – New Zealand's largest overseas military deployment since the Korean War. Overall New Zealand's contribution saw just short of 4,000 New Zealanders serve in East Timor. In addition to their operations against militia, the New Zealand troops were also involved in construction of roads and schools, water supplies, training the nascent Timor Leste Defence Force (F-FDTL) and other infrastructural assistance. English lessons and medical aid were also provided. New Zealand Defence Force personnel were withdrawn in November 2002 leaving only a small training team for the F-FDTL. However, in May 2006 widespread fighting broke out in the Timorese capital of Dili as a result of a mass resignation of 591 soldiers and increasing tension between the F-FDTL and the East Timorese police (PNTL). A contingent of 120 troops were dispatched and provided security in Dili alongside soldiers and police from Australia, Malaysia and Portugal. Four New Zealand peacekeepers have been killed on operations in East Timor.

Solomon Islands (2003–2013)

New Zealand participated in the Regional Assistance Mission to the Solomon Islands (RAMSI), which aimed to restore peace following the Solomon Islands civil war. RAMSI acted as an interim police force and has been successful in improving the country's overall security conditions, including brokering the surrender of a notorious warlord, Harold Keke. New Zealand contributed four helicopters and about 230 personnel consisting of infantry, engineers, medical and support staff. RAMSI was scaled down in July 2004, as stability had gradually been restored to the country. It was now primarily a police force. In 2007, New Zealand forces provided support relief in the aftermath of the 2 April 2007 Solomon Islands earthquake. The Mission ended in August 2013.

Iraq, (2003–present)

The New Zealand government opposed and officially condemned the 2003 Invasion of Iraq. Despite this, the frigate HMNZS Te Kaha (F77) and an RNZAF P-3 Orion maritime surveillance aircraft were deployed to the Gulf, under US command.

Following the invasion, later in 2003 New Zealand supplied a number of engineers and armed troops to the coalition effort. Task Group Rake, a Royal New Zealand Engineers group, joined Multi-National Division South East for one year under British Army command. Cables leaked by WikiLeaks in 2010 suggested New Zealand had only done so in order to keep valuable Oil for Food contracts.

In accordance with United Nations Security Council Resolution 1483 New Zealand also contributed a small engineering and support force to assist in post-war reconstruction and provision of humanitarian aid. The engineers returned home in October 2004, but liaison and staff officers remained in Iraq working with coalition forces. As of 2012, one military observer from New Zealand was serving as part of the United Nations Assistance Mission in Iraq.

On the 10th anniversary of the invasion, New Zealand journalist Jon Stephenson – who was in Baghdad when the war began – said New Zealand's contribution to the recovery effort had been "grossly overstated".

Tonga (2006)

On 18 November 2006, a contingent of seventy-two New Zealand Defence Force personnel and additional New Zealand Police officers was deployed to Tonga at the Tongan Government's request to assist in the restoration of calm after an outbreak of violence in the nation's capital, Nukualofa. They were joined by Australian soldiers and Australian Federal Police officers. Their main objective is to assist the Tongan forces in protecting Tonga's international airport in Nukualofa. The personnel returned on 2 December.

Antarctica

New Zealand's armed forces have been involved in Antarctic research and exploration since the 1950s. The Air Force operated two Auster T7 and a Beaver in Antarctica in the late 1950s, the Austers somewhat unsuccessfully. The navy has escorted supply ships and conducted its own supply missions, provided weather monitoring and support for U.S. activities in the 'frozen continent', conducted scientific research, and helped build Scott Base. In 1964, 40 Squadron, Royal New Zealand Air Force, was re-equipped with the C-130H Hercules and, the following year, commenced regular flights to and from the Antarctic. The army, and later the other two services, have provided cargo handlers. No. 5 Squadron has operated in the airspace over and near Scott Base to provide search and rescue standby and to drop mail and medical supplies to the people wintering over.

See also
 List of New Zealand military personnel
 List of New Zealander Victoria Cross recipients
 Military history of Oceania
 New Zealand Defence Force

Footnotes

References

 Loveridge, Steven. "Another Great War? New Zealand interpretations of the First World War towards and into the Second World War" First World War Studies (2016), pp. 303–25.

 

Kaye, C.M.S. Mission Extraordinary Zimbabwe – Rhodesia, British Army Review, 1980. Lock, Peter. & Cooke Peter, Fighting Vehicles and Weapons of Rhodesia, P&P Publishing, Wellington, 1995. Lovett, John. Contact, Galaxie Press, Salisbury, 1979. Moorcroft, Paul. Contact II, Sygma Press, Johannesburg, 1981.

External links

 NZhistory.net.nz  – war and society
 Official History of New Zealand in the Second World War
 WW2 day by day
 New Zealand Fighter Pilots Museum
 New Zealand Victoria Cross winners
 New Zealand in the Second World War
 New Zealand Military Historical Society Inc.